Amorbimorpha powelliana is a species of moth of the family Tortricidae. It is found in Mexico (Nuevo Leon and possibly Hidalgo).

The length of the forewings is 12.7–14.5 mm for males and 11.7–15.5 mm for females. The ground colour of the forewings of the males is brownish orange. The hindwings are shining ivory white, gradually bronzed toward the distal regions. Females have dark brownish orange or reddish orange forewings, the markings suffused and less distinct than in the males. Adults have been recorded on wing in mid-September.

Etymology
The species is names in honour of Jerry Powell, a tortricid systematist who collected the only known specimens and reared the type series from a wild-caught female.

References

Moths described in 2012
Sparganothini
Moths of Central America